The Cessna Citation X is an American business jet produced by Cessna and part of the Citation family.
Announced at the October 1990 NBAA convention, the Model 750 made its maiden flight on December 21, 1993, received its type certification on June 3, 1996, and was first delivered in July 1996.

The updated Citation X+ was offered from 2012 with a  cabin stretch and upgraded systems.

Keeping the Citation III fuselage cross section, it has a new 37° swept wing with an area of 527 ft² (49 m2) for a fast Mach 0.935 MMo and a 36,600 lb (16.6 t) MTOW for a 3,460 nmi (6,408 km) range, a T-tail and two 7,034 lbf (31.29 kN) AE3007 turbofans.

After 338 deliveries, production ended in 2018.

Development

When the Citation X was announced, the Citation 650 series, the "family" at the top of the product line, the Citations III, VI, and VII, was eight years old. In 1990, Cessna made a proposition for an improved 650 model to their Customer Advisory Council. The council was interested in some new elements such as increased speed and a pressurized baggage compartment. This pushed Cessna toward the Citation X program, which became the new 750 series.

Cessna wanted to improve the image of the Citation family. The Citation models that emerged in the 1970s were originally intended to be practical and with good handling qualities. Consequently, they turned out to be much slower than the competing Learjets. Cessna had difficulties in shedding the popular image of the Citation as a slow airplane, even though their jets had eventually become as fast as the competition.

The development of the Citation X was first announced at the National Business Aviation Association Convention in New Orleans in October 1990, with the first prototype making its maiden flight on December 21, 1993. Originally scheduled for August 1995, the certification of the Cessna Citation X was delayed several times. First, failure of the airframe and engine to meet Federal Aviation Administration requirements caused the planned certification date postponement to late November 1995. The main delay reasons were troubles integrating the avionics and the engine to the aircraft, high-altitude and low-speed engine flameout (high wing attack angles caused insufficient airflow), engines not meeting the bird strike criteria and directional stability challenges. Efforts to increase the maximum take-off weight of the Citation X by about 800 pounds again delayed the FAA certification schedule, this time to April 1996. These changes were aimed at permitting a full-fuel payload of 1,400 pounds (seven passengers), but Cessna had difficulty achieving a balance between reducing Citation X cabin noise and minimizing the extra weight of sound-dampening materials. The certification, FAA FAR Part 25, Amendment 74, Certification 3, was finally achieved on June 3, 1996.

The first Citation X was delivered in July 1996 to golfer and long-time Cessna customer Arnold Palmer. Once in use, the Citation X continued to set speed records. Arnold Palmer set one of them in September 1997:  on a 5,000 km closed course. In February 1997, the Citation X design team was awarded the National Aeronautic Association's Robert J. Collier Trophy. The Citation X was approved by Transport Canada on May 22, 1998, and by the European Joint Aviation Authorities in 1999. In October 2000, Cessna announced an upgrade for all Citation Xs to be delivered after January 1, 2002. The main characteristics of this upgraded version were a 5% increase in thrust, a  increase in maximum take-off weight, and improved Honeywell avionics.

Citation X+
In 2010, Cessna initiated a major update of the aircraft, initially dubbed the Citation Ten, which included upgraded AE3007C2 engines with new fans, Garmin G5000 flight displays with three  screens, and a heads-up display. First flight was completed on January 17, 2012.

Design

The Citation X uses a new wing, tail, tail cone, landing gear, and systems, designed from scratch and not based on prior Citations. Part commonality is limited to some cockpit controls, the windshield, and the tail light bulb. The pressure bulkhead is also similar to previous designs. The Citation X has the same fuselage cross-section as the Citations III, VI and VII; however, the wing attachment to the fuselage is different from the attachment in previous Citation. The Citation X was the first aircraft from Cessna to use a Rolls-Royce engine and fully-integrated avionics.

The aircraft incorporates a number of innovative design features. One attribute that is often first noticed is the large diameter of the engine intakes. This feature, related to the high bypass ratio turbofan, reduces the noise from the engines and improves fuel efficiency. Another obvious characteristic is the highly swept wing with a supercritical airfoil, used in order to increase the critical Mach number and therefore the top speed. The Citation X has 37 degrees of sweepback at the quarter chord, more than any other business jet and, among civil aircraft, second only to the Boeing 747's 37.5 degrees. The horizontal and vertical stabilizers are also highly swept and are arranged in a T-tail configuration.

Airframe

A significant amount of effort throughout the design process was directed towards reducing the Citation X's total drag. The resulting design includes an area-ruled fuselage for efficient transonic flight and a highly swept supercritical wing. The Citation X's wing is slung below the fuselage rather than passing through it. This allows increased volume in the fuselage, a one-piece wing, and simplified wing-fuselage connections.

Engines

The Citation X is powered by two Rolls-Royce AE 3007C (up to S/N 750-172) or AE 3007C1 engines (S/N 750-173 and subsequent), each with 6442 lbs (28.66 kN) or 6764 lbs (30.09 kN) of thrust, respectively. They are pod-mounted on the sides of the rear fuselage. It is the first Cessna aircraft to be powered by a Rolls-Royce engine. The engine has solid titanium blades and a three-stage low-pressure turbine. The engine's fan has approximately a 5 to 1 bypass ratio for improved fuel efficiency and low acoustic signature. The unit also incorporates the Honeywell GTCP36-150CX Auxiliary Power Unit (APU).

Powered controls

Another first for Cessna is the inclusion of powered controls in the Citation X. The controls are powered by dual-hydraulic systems for redundancy. There are two elevators and the tailplane is all-moving for trim. The rudder is in two pieces: the lower portion is hydraulically powered and the upper portion is electrically powered. Each wing has five spoiler panels, to be used both for roll control (in addition to the ailerons) and as speed brakes. One of the major challenges of the Citation X design was finding enough space in the wing to run all the necessary hydraulic lines. As Paul Kalberer, the chief engineer of the Citation X program, explained, the Citation X needs just as many hydraulic pumps and actuators as a large airliner, but has much less space inside the wings.

Avionics

Honeywell provides the avionics system for the glass cockpit. The Honeywell Primus 2000 EFIS flight director system is composed of five 7-inch × 8-inch CRT screens. Dual flight management systems with GPS are standard.

In the Citation X+ the avionics were changed to the Garmin 5000 system.

Elliptical winglets
In 2008, Winglet Technology, with the help of Cessna, began flight testing epoxy/graphite elliptical winglets on a Citation X. Flight testing was nearing completion in late 2008, with FAA supplemental type certification expected in 2009. The winglets increase range by 150 nm, lower fuel burn by 4–5%, improve hot and high performance as well as climb rate, permitting a climb to flight level 430 in 22 minutes, as opposed to 26 minutes without the modification. Climb to flight level 450 at maximum takeoff weight is possible without a step climb. Cruise speed at altitude is expected to increase by 15 knots, and maximum takeoff weight will increase by 1200 lbs (545 kg). Excluding installation, the kit's projected cost is $395,000.

Elliptical winglets were made standard on Citation X+.

Operators
Multiple companies have purchased the Cessna Citation X, including Waitt Media, Honeywell, Target Corporation, Townsend Engineering, General Motors and Schweitzer Engineering Laboratories since 2002.

Private owners included film director Sydney Pollack, attorney Fred Furth, Oracle's Larry Ellison, entrepreneur Steve Fossett, Formula One driver Nelson Piquet, 45th US president Donald Trump and golfer Arnold Palmer.

NetJets ordered 60, then another 21, at the standard 10.5% discount, flying it 1,100 to 1,200 hr. per year, and XOJET, started in 2006, operates 20 jets.

Specifications

See also

Notes

References

External links

 

Citation X
1990s United States business aircraft
Twinjets
Low-wing aircraft
Citation 010
T-tail aircraft
Aircraft first flown in 1993